Indian Public Health Association shortly IPHA is a professional health organization working for the cause of Public Health in India since 1956. It is registered under Societies Registration Act XXI of 1860.

Objectives
IPHA helps Indian government to promote public health and secure Indian citizens with safe medical environment. It also serves the role of publishing science journals and inform medical knowledge to Indians.

References

External links
 Official site of IPHA.
Indian Heart Association

Public health organisations based in India
1956 establishments in West Bengal
Organizations established in 1956
Companies based in Kolkata